"It Takes Time" is a song written by Shirley Eikhard and originally performed by Anne Murray. Eikhard was 15 years old at the time of Murray's recording; it was her first professionally recorded composition.

Murray's version of the song reached No. 1 on the Canadian Adult Contemporary chart, #6 on the Canadian Country chart, and #26 on the Canadian Pop chart in 1971. The song also appeared on her 1971 album, Straight, Clean and Simple.  The song was produced by Brian Ahern.

At the age of 16, Eikhard released her version of the song. Issued as a single, the track reached No. 7 on the Canadian Adult Contemporary chart and #33 on the Canadian Country chart. It was released on her 1972 album, Shirley Eikhard.

Chart performance

Anne Murray

Shirley Eikhard

Other cover versions
Later in 1971, Kim Carnes recorded a version of the song.  It appeared on her debut album, Rest on Me, produced by Jimmy Bowen.

References

1971 singles
Anne Murray songs
Shirley Eikhard songs
Capitol Records singles
1971 songs
Songs written by Shirley Eikhard
Song recordings produced by Brian Ahern (producer)